The NHRA Winternationals (commonly called the Winternats) are an annual drag racing event held by the National Hot Rod Association (NHRA) at Auto Club Raceway in Pomona, California.

In 1962, under pressure from Peggy Hart (wife of track owner "Pappy" Hart) and Mickey Thompson, as well as fellow racers Shirley Shahan and Roberta Leighton, Carol Cox was the first woman allowed to race at an NHRA national event. Cox drove a 1961 Pontiac Ventura with a  V8, which was driven (not trailered) to Pomona. Some racers believe a class win is more difficult to achieve than a handicap (eliminator) win.

At the 1966 event, Shahan was the first woman to claim a national event eliminator crown, by taking Stock Eliminator. The win put her on the cover of National Dragster.

NHRA debuted the new Top Fuel Funny Car (TF/FC) class at the Winternationals in 1969; Funny Car Eliminator (FCE) would be won by Clare Sanders, teammate of "Jungle Jim" Liberman.

In 1970, Top Fuel Eliminator (quickset fuel car of the meet, digger or flopper) went to Larry Dixon,

The AA/FC winner was the 1970 Dodge Charger, Hawaiian, of Larry Reyes (driving for Roland Leong). Barrie Poole became the first Canadian to win an NHRA national event, taking the 1970 Super Stock title.

The Funny Car Eliminator title at the 1971 Winternats would go to Leong's Hawaiian. with Butch Maas at the wheel. Don Garlits' novel rear-engined dragster appeared at the Winternats that year, qualifying with 6.8; his best time of the meet was a 6.70, over Jim Dunn's 7.58, in the semi-final: Garlits would win, when Kenny Safford broke in the final. The last Top Gas Eliminator crown, before NHRA abolished the class, went to Walt Stevens, at the wheel of Ken Theiss' twin-engined Odd Couple TG/D. The year's award for Best Engineered Car went to Jim Busby, with a dragster powered by a pair of injected  DOHC Ford Indy V8 engines. (Hank Westmoreland failed to qualify the car, and it never ran again.) Canadian Barrie Poole repeated his 1970 Winternats win in Super Stock, in a Sandy Elliot Mustang.

The 1971 meet was marred by the death of "Sneaky Pete" Robinson, who wrecked his TF/D in qualifying, with a 6.77 pass.

Altereds were so popular in the 1960s and 1970s, at the 1977 Winternationals, more than 75 drivers contested for the Comp Eliminator title.  Among them was Ed Prout, who brought his A/Altered from Connecticut.

NHRA introduced a significant change to the Christmas tree, LEDs instead of incandescent bulbs, at Pomona in 2003.

At Pomona in 2014, Alexis DeJoria became the first woman ever to make a sub-four second pass, with a 3.997-second e.t.

In 2018, Top Fuel Dragster went to Doug Kalitta, Top fuel Funny Car to Matt Hagan, and Pro Stock to Bo Butner.

In 2021, the Winternationals was moved to July because of the ongoing coronavirus pandemic and restrictions imposed by California.  The NHRA will move the Gatornationals to the season opening slot.  In an unusual fashion, the Top Fuel final was determined by default when one finalist was pulled out by NHRA officials over driver safety when he had heat exhaustion.

Past class winners

Notes 

 
Drag racing events
Annual sporting events
February sporting events
Motorsport in California